Manitoba Provincial Road 468 is a provincial road in the southwestern section of the Canadian province of Manitoba.

Route description 

PR 468 is a north–south provincial road that begins at PR 457 near Chater, and travels to its northbound terminus with PR 353 near the unincorporated community of Moore Park.

The road provides north–south access to the unincorporated communities of Chater and Justice, and it intersects with the Trans-Canada Highway between these two communities.

PR 468 is paved between its southbound terminus and the Trans-Canada Highway, and is a gravel road for the remainder of the route.

History 
In the early 1990s, the Manitoba government decommissioned a number of provincial secondary roads and returned the maintenance of these roads back to the rural municipalities. A small portion of the original PR 468 was included in this decommissioning.

Prior to this, PR 468 continued east in concurrence with PR 353 for  past Moore Park. From this point, it continued north into the Rural Municipality of Minto-Odanah to its terminus with PR 465.

This section is now a municipal road.

References

External links 
Manitoba Official Map - Southwest
 

468